Michael Araujo is a retired South African soccer player who played professionally in South Africa, the United States, Canada and Ireland.

Player

Club career
Araujo's parents moved from Portugal to South Africa where he was born. In 1986, Araujo entered the College of Boca Raton, now known as Lynn University. He played two seasons of NAIA soccer at Boca Raton, winning the 1987 NAIA national men's soccer championship. Araujo was also a 1987 NAIA Second Team All American. He finished his degree at Florida Atlantic University. In 1990, Roy Wiggemansen, former coach of Boca Raton, brought Araujo into the Montreal Supra which Wiggemansen now coached. Araujo was a Canadian Soccer League All League midfielder that year. In 1991, he returned to Florida where he played for Holly FC in the Gold Coast League In 1992, he played a single season for the Boca Raton Sabres in the USISL. On 30 March 1993, Araujo became one of the first players signed by the Coral Springs Kicks. He led the USISL in assists that season. In the fall of 1993, Araujo moved to Northern Ireland to play for Glenavon F.C. In 1995, he played for the Atlanta Ruckus in the A-League. He moved indoors in the fall of 1995 with the Cincinnati Silverbacks of the National Professional Soccer League, playing three seasons with the Silverbacks. In the spring of 1997, Araujo played four games for the Orlando Sundogs of the USISL before signing with the Sacramento Knights of the Continental Indoor Soccer League for the summer indoor season. In 1998, Araujo moved back to South Africa to join SuperSport United. In 1999, the team won the Nedbank Cup. Araujo lives and plays for amateur and division four clubs in the United States. In 2007, he played for the Fox and Hounds in the Gold Coast Soccer League Over 30 Division. In 2008, he was with Fort Lauderdale in the Florida Elite Soccer League.

International
Araujo played/captained the South African youth national team(1983&1984).

Coach
Director of coaching for Teamboca boys soccer program (2002–present)

References

Living people
1969 births
South African people of Portuguese descent
Atlanta Silverbacks players
American Professional Soccer League players
Boca Raton Sabres players
Cincinnati Silverbacks players
Continental Indoor Soccer League players
Expatriate association footballers in Northern Ireland
Expatriate soccer players in Canada
Expatriate soccer players in the United States
Glenavon F.C. players
Canadian Soccer League (1987–1992) players
Lynn Fighting Knights men's soccer players
Montreal Supra players
National Professional Soccer League (1984–2001) players
Orlando Sundogs players
Sacramento Knights players
South African expatriate sportspeople in Canada
South African expatriate sportspeople in the United States
South African soccer players
South African expatriate soccer players
SuperSport United F.C. players
USISL players
A-League (1995–2004) players
Association football forwards